Aslauga purpurascens is a butterfly in the family Lycaenidae. It is found in Cameroon, Gabon, the Republic of the Congo, the Central African Republic, the Democratic Republic of the Congo (Kinshasa, Ituri and North Kivu), Uganda, Rwanda, Burundi, Kenya, Tanzania and Zambia. The habitat consists of forests.

The larvae feed on Oxyrachis, Mesohomotoma and Stictococcus species. They are shaped like a limpet shell, and coloured in mottled greys and greens to represent lichen or moss on bark.

References

External links
Images representing Aslauga purpurascens at Barcodes of Life
Seitz A. Die Gross-Schmetterlinge der Erde 13: Die Afrikanischen Tagfalter. Plate XIII 64

Butterflies described in 1890
Aslauga
Butterflies of Africa